Unreleased is the eighth album released by rapper, Andre Nickatina. It was released in 2001 and was produced by Andre Nickatina, Nick Peace, Juilan Piccolo, Smoov-E and the Fillmoe Coleman Band (Black Diamond & Tebo). The album contained unreleased and rare tracks that did not make it to any of Nickatina's previous albums and was sold exclusively at Nickatina's concerts.

Track listing
"Dre Dog"- 0:47 
"Candy Rain"- 1:54 
"The Ave." (Murder Remix)- 3:57 
"I Love U Rose"- 1:16 
"Son of an Angel"- 3:27 
"Coka Cola"- 3:03 
"Minnesota Masterpiece"- 1:34 
"A Quarter to 4"- 4:06 
"Sweet Sun Duck"- 2:04 
"Bonus"- 5:07 
"Messin Around"- 7:27

2001 albums
Andre Nickatina albums